Holy Name of Jesus Cathedral may refer to:

 Holy Name of Jesus Cathedral, Fianarantsoa, Madagascar
 Holy Name of Jesus Cathedral, Raleigh, United States

See also 
 Holy Name Cathedral (disambiguation)